Organization of Working-Class Freedom Fighters or simply Razmandegan, was a communist party in Iran that opposed both the Soviet line and the guerrilla doctrine.

References

Defunct communist parties in Iran
Political parties of the Iranian Revolution
Banned political parties in Iran
Banned communist parties
Far-left political parties
Marxist organizations
1979 establishments in Iran
Political parties established in 1979